Raw Materials  is a studio album by American jazz pianist Vijay Iyer and American jazz saxophonist Rudresh Mahanthappa. The album was released on  via Savoy Jazz label.

Reception
David R. Adler of JazzTimes stated "The two cover plenty of ground but aren’t at all longwinded. Somehow their impeccable precision enhances rather than limits their improvisational freedom. Their challenging rhythmic syntax, well documented on their respective quartet discs, takes on a greater immediacy in the duo context".

Jonathan Widran of Allmusic wrote "For the first time, they distill their otherworldly, closely entwined musical language into a 13-track recording on Raw Materials -- the first 12 of which are from the suite "Sangha: Collaborative Fables," which was commissioned by the Jazz Gallery with a grant from the Rockefeller Foundation Multi-Arts Production Fund... They're a brilliantly talented, visionary but unusual pair whose debut will appeal mostly to jazz and classical fans with open minds".

Track listing

Personnel
Vijay Iyer – arranger, piano, producer
Rudresh Mahanthappa – arranger, composer, producer, saxophone

References

2006 albums
Vijay Iyer albums
Jazz albums by American artists